Micevski is a Macedonian surname, it may refer to:
 Darko Micevski, Macedonian footballer
 David Micevski, Australian footballer
 Mike Micevski, Australian footballer
 Toni Micevski, Macedonian footballer
 Vančo Micevski, Macedonian footballer

Macedonian-language surnames

de:Micevski